Neo-futurism is a late-20th to early-21st-century movement in the arts, design, and architecture.

Described as an avant-garde movement, as well as a futuristic rethinking of the thought behind aesthetics and functionality of design in growing cities, the movement has its origins in the mid-20th-century structural expressionist work of architects such as Alvar Aalto and Buckminster Fuller.

Futurist architecture began in the 20th century starting with styles such as Art Deco and later with the Googie movement as well as high-tech architecture.

Origins
Beginning in the late 1960s and early 1970s by architects such as Buckminster Fuller and John C. Portman Jr.; architect and industrial designer Eero Saarinen, Archigram, an avant-garde architectural group (Peter Cook, Warren Chalk, Ron Herron, Dennis Crompton, Michael Webb and David Greene, Jan Kaplický and others); it is considered in part an evolution out of high-tech architecture, developing many of the same themes and ideas.

Although it was never built, the Fun Palace (1961), interpreted by architect Cedric Price as a "giant neo-futurist machine", influenced other architects, notably Richard Rogers and Renzo Piano, whose Centre Pompidou extended many of Price's ideas.

Definition
Neo-futurism was in part revitalised in 2007 after the publication of "The Neo-Futuristic City Manifesto" included in the candidature presented to the Bureau International des Expositions (BIE) and written by innovation designer Vito Di Bari (a former executive director at UNESCO), to outline his vision for the city of Milan at the time of the Universal Expo 2015. Di Bari defined his neo-futuristic vision as the "cross-pollination of art, cutting edge technologies and ethical values combined to create a pervasively higher quality of life"; he referenced the Fourth Pillar of Sustainable Development Theory and reported that the name had been inspired by the United Nations report Our Common Future.

Soon after Di Bari's manifesto, a collective in the UK called The Neo-Futurist Collective, launched their own version of the Neo-futurist manifesto, written by Rowena Easton, on the streets of Brighton on 20 February 2008, to mark the 99th anniversary of the publication of the Futurist manifesto by FT Marinetti in 1909. The collective's take on Neo-Futurism was much different to Di Bari's, in a sense that it focussed on acknowledging the legacy of the Italian Futurists as well as criticising our current state of despair over climate change and the financial system. On their introduction to their manifesto, The Neo-Futurist Collective noted: “In an age of mass despair over the state of the planet and the financial system, the futurist legacy of optimism for the power of technology uniting with the imagination of humanity has a powerful resonance for our modern age”. This shows an interpretation of Neo-Futurism that is more socially involved – one that speaks directly to its followers rather than denoting certain outlooks through actions (e.g. choice of eco-aware materials in Neo-Futurist architecture).

Jean-Louis Cohen has defined neo-futurism as a corollary to technology, noting that a large amount of the structures built today are byproducts of new materials and concepts about the function of large-scale constructions in society. Etan J. Ilfeld wrote that in the contemporary neo-futurist aesthetic "the machine becomes an integral element of the creative process itself, and generates the emergence of artistic modes that would have been impossible prior to computer technology." Reyner Banham's definition of "une architecture autre" is a call for an architecture that technologically overcomes all previous architectures but possessing an expressive form, as Banham stated about neo-futuristic "Archigram's Plug-in Computerized City, form does not have to follow function into oblivion."

Matthew Phillips defined the Neo-Futurist aesthetic as a "manipulation of time, space, and subject against a backdrop of technological innovation and domination, [that] posits new approaches to the future contrary to those of past avant-gardes and current technocratic philosophies". This definition agrees with the work of Neo-Futurist architects whose approach is situated in the context of technological innovation, but does not mention the ecological mindfulness that stems from architectural Neo-Futurism.

In art and architecture
Neo-futurism was inspired partly by Futurist architect Antonio Sant'Elia and pioneered from the early 1960s and the late 1970s by Hal Foster, with architects such as William Pereira, Charles Luckman and Henning Larsen.

People
The relaunch of neo-futurism in the 21st century has been creatively inspired by the Pritzker Architecture Prize-winning architect Zaha Hadid and architect Santiago Calatrava.

Neo-futurist architects, designers and artists include people like , Patrick Jouin, Yuima Nakazato, artist Simon Stålenhag and artist Charis Tsevis. Neo-futurism has absorbed some high-tech architectural themes and ideas, incorporating elements of high-tech industry and technology іnto building design: Technology and context has been a focus for some architects such as Buckminster Fuller, Norman Foster, Kenzo Tange, Renzo Piano and Richard Rogers.

Gallery

See also
Futurist architecture

References

Further reading 

 
 
 
 
 Rowena Easton, The NeoFuturist Manifesto, 2008 
 
 A History of Neo-Futurism, Erica Anne Milkovich, 2010 - Avant-garde (Aesthetics)
 Gunther Berghaus, From Futurism to Neo-Futurism, in Avant-garde/Neo-avant-garde, 2005, published by Dietrich Scheunemann, Rodopi BV 
 Colin Rowe, Fred Koetter, After the Millennium, in Collage City, 1983, published by Architecture – The MIT Press, Cambridge, MA
 Etan Jonathan Ilfeld, Beyond Contemporary Art, 2012, Vivays Publishing, London
 Anthony Vidler, Histories of the immediate present, 2008 MIT Press, Massachusetts Institute of Technology 
 Reyner Banham, "A Clip-on Architecture," Architectural Design 35, no. 11
 Reyner Banham: Historian of the Immediate Future (Cambridge: MIT Press, 2002)
 Ru Brown, FUTURISM IS DEAD LONG LIVE FUTURISM The legacy of techno-love in contemporary design, 2011, University of Washington – MDes Design Investigations
 Gabriel Gyang Dung, Bridget Mlumun Akaakohol, J.C. Akor – The Concept Of Sustainable Development And The Challenges Of Economic Growth And Development In Nigeria – July 2014, Department of Economics, College of Education, Katsina-Ala.

External links

Futurist movements
 
Contemporary art movements
21st century in art
21st-century architectural styles
Avant-garde art